Indira Maira Alfonzo Izaguirre (born 29 April 1968; La Guaira, Venezuela) is a Venezuelan judge who until May 2020 served as the first vice president of the Supreme Tribunal of Justice of Venezuela (TSJ) and as president of the Electoral Chamber. In June 2020, she sworn in as chief rector and president of the National Electoral Council (CNE) by the TSJ, to organize 2020 Venezuelan parliamentary election. Her position in the CNE is contested by the National Assembly, organism in charge of selecting the CNE members, but the parliament was deemed in “unconstitutional omission” by the TSJ.

Magistrate of the Supreme Tribunal of Justice 

Sanctions 

Responding to the May 2018 Venezuelan presidential election, Canada sanctioned 14 Venezuelans, including Alfonzo, stating that the "economic, political and humanitarian crisis in Venezuela has continued to worsen as it moves ever closer to full dictatorship." The government said the 2018 presidential election was "illegitimate and anti-democratic", and sanctioned Alfonzo, along with 13 other members of the ANC and TSJ.

The United States sanctioned Alfonzo and three others on 4 September 2020, accusing them of facilitating the Maduro government's efforts to undermine the independence and democratic order of Venezuela. According to Treasury Secretary Steven Mnuchin, he said that "the corrupt Maduro regime is attempting to seize control of the National Assembly of Venezuela through a fraudulent election.” The sanctions were announced as the country prepares the National Assembly elections on 6 December, which opposition parties consider it fraudulent and announced their boycott.

References 

1968 births
Living people
Electoral branch of the Government of Venezuela
People of the Crisis in Venezuela
Venezuelan women judges
People from La Guaira
20th-century Venezuelan women
21st-century Venezuelan women